The W.G. Bowman House is a historic house in Nogales, Arizona. It was built in 1918 for Wirt Bowman, a businessman who served as the mayor of Nogales from 1918 to 1919 and as a member of the Arizona House of Representatives from 1919 to 1920. It was designed in the Classical Revival architectural style. It has been listed on the National Register of Historic Places since August 29, 1985.

References

		
National Register of Historic Places in Santa Cruz County, Arizona
Neoclassical architecture in Arizona
Houses completed in 1918
1918 establishments in Arizona